Helsinki University Museum is the museum of the University of Helsinki.

The museum was located until June 2014 in a building called Arppeanum on Snellmanninkatu off the north-east corner of Senate Square. Museum's new main exhibition opened in Helsinki University Main Building in March 2015.

External links 
 

University of Helsinki
Museums in Helsinki
University museums in Finland
Science museums in Finland
History museums in Finland
Pharmacy museums
Medical museums
Medical and health organisations based in Finland